The reduction of carbon emissions, along with other greenhouse gases (GHGs), has become a vitally important task of international, national and local actors. If we understand governance as the creation of “conditions for ordered rule and collective action” then, given the fact that the reduction of carbon emissions will require concerted collective action, it follows that the governance of carbon will be of paramount concern. We have seen numerous international conferences over the past 20 years tasked with finding a way of facilitating this, and while international agreements have been infamously difficult to reach, action at the national level has been much more effective. In the UK, the Climate Change Act 2008 committed the government to meeting significant carbon reduction targets. In England, these carbon emissions are governed using numerous different instruments, which involve a variety of actors. While it has been argued by authors like Rhodes that there has been a “hollowing out” of the nation state, and that governments have lost their capabilities to govern to a variety of non-state actors and the European Union, the case of carbon governance in England actually runs counter to this. The government body responsible for the task, the Department of Energy and Climate Change (DECC), is the “main external dynamic” behind governing actions in this area, and “rather than hollowing out (there has actually been a strengthening of) central co-ordination”. The department may rely on other bodies to deliver its desired outcomes, but it is still ultimately responsible for the imposition of the rules and regulations that “steer (carbon) governmental action at the national level”. It is therefore evident that carbon governance in England is hierarchical in nature, in that “legislative decisions and executive decisions” are the main dynamic behind carbon governance action. This does not deny the existence of a network of bodies around DECC who are part of the process, but they are supplementary actors who are steered by central decisions. This article focuses on carbon governance in England as the other countries of the UK (Scotland, Wales and Northern Ireland) all have devolved assemblies who are responsible for the governance of carbon emissions in their respective countries.

Policy Instruments

Climate Change Levy (CCL)
A Climate Change Levy is a tax on carbon use in industry, commerce and the public sector introduced by the British government in 2001, with the overall aim of promoting carbon efficiency and stimulating investment in low carbon technology. While representing what is classed as a “market-based instrument”, in that it represents an economic incentive to manage carbon usage more effectively, the CCL is not what is understood as market governance. This is because CCL is not representative of the market steering actors in their carbon behaviour, but the government imposing a sanction to govern behaviour, which is constitutive of hierarchical governance.

Climate Change Agreements (CCAs)
Introduced at the same time as the CCL, Climate Change Agreements are “negotiated agreements between sector industry organisations and the government” whereby “energy-intensive industries can obtain a 65% discount from the CCL, provided they meet challenging targets for improving their energy efficiency or reducing carbon emissions”. This is an interesting example of governing carbon behaviour in a more indirect fashion. The DECC is still the authoritative body, but these voluntary agreements represent their attempt to create an atmosphere where it is seen as advantageous to business to manage carbon emissions. They have not done this through traditional regulatory controls, in that they have not imposed this rule upon industry. By instead offering businesses incentives to reduce carbon emissions through a tax reduction, they are enhancing the desire of business sectors to make the choice to become more carbon efficient. The DECC asserts its authority over the process by the imposition of penalties if participating industries do not comply with their agreed targets. It represents the government concerning itself with the outcome of the policy, rather than regulating the entire process.

Enhanced Capital Allowances (ECA)
This represents a further example of a government implemented, voluntary scheme that shapes the carbon behaviour of businesses, but the actual management of this scheme is delegated to a specialised body, The Carbon Trust. The scheme encourages businesses to invest in low-carbon technology by offering a “100% first-year capital allowances on their spending on qualifying plant and machinery”. Only new equipment is eligible for an ECA – used or second-hand equipment does not qualify. Eligible equipment, and the criteria they have to meet, is published in the Energy Technology List. The criteria are reviewed annually to keep pace with technological progress

The Carbon Trust and the ECA
By providing a management service on behalf of the government, The Carbon Trust is actually helping govern a part of the carbon sector in England. Although created by the government in 2001, they are a private company, which means that, arguably, they represent the diminishment of central capacity to fulfil governing tasks. However, if the workings of the scheme and the part The Carbon Trust have to play is examined, then the opposite is true. In this instance DECC involved The Carbon Trust, as a body specialised in energy efficiency, and delegated responsibility to them “to ensure sufficient expertise” is brought to the governing process. It is still the government's decision to delegate such responsibility, and it is their policy that is being enacted. They have simply enlisted the help of an expert body to ensure that their desired outcomes are met.

Emissions trading
Emissions trading constitutes a massive part of carbon governance in England. While it has been argued that this is an attempt to allow markets to govern carbon emissions by incentivising their proper management and allowing them to be traded and priced by supply and demand, the hierarchical influence of the governmental institutions, the EU and DECC, are still evident and prevent emissions trading in England in its current form being considered market governance. There are two emissions trading systems operating in England at this present moment, and the way in which they are governed is emblematic of the hierarchical nature of carbon governance at the national level.

The UK Emissions Trading Scheme (UK ETS)
The former UK Emissions Trading Scheme was a voluntary cap-and-trade scheme where participants were allocated an allowance of emissions, which included other GHGs as well as carbon, and if a participating company emitted less than their cap for that year they could trade the remaining allowances. It has now closed to new participants but allowances are still traded. While this may appear as recourse to the market to effectively govern carbon emissions, the fact remains “in order to govern through markets, governments must first create those markets through the exercise of a hierarchical authority”. The UK ETS was created by the Department for Environment, Food and Rural Affairs (DEFRA), the then responsible government department, and it was the government's ambitious emissions reduction target that “spurred the UK to innovate with”  this particular instrument. The Trading Registry for emissions is also run through DECC, exemplifying the government's centralisation of the process and while it was left to businesses to decide how to manage their carbon emissions, and the market to decide the price, it was the governments desire to reach emissions targets and “reduce (the) economic cost” of doing so that was being represented.

A new post-Brexit UK Emissions Trading Scheme (UK ETS) came into operation on 1 January 2021 following the UK's departure from the European Union.

EU Emissions Trading Scheme (EU ETS)
Introduced by the European Commission (EC) and launched in 2005, the EU Emissions Trading Scheme is similar to the UK ETS in the sense that it is a cap-and-trade scheme, but it is mandatory and its participants account for 40% of the EU's total GHG emissions. With regards to the governance of carbon in England, the scheme covers industries responsible for 48% of the UK's total carbon emissions. Because the European Commission, which supersedes the UK government in terms of legislative authority, enacted the system its introduction presents a challenge to the central power of the UK government in terms of carbon management. Rhodes cited “the loss of functions by British government to EU institutions” as evidence of the nation state becoming ‘hollowed out’ and while this system was imposed upon England by an EU body, there is some evidence to suggest that the British government still retains some central authority.

National Allocation Plans (NAPs)
These are a calculation of an “overall cap on the total emissions allowed from all the installations covered by the EU ETS” by member states which are submitted to the EC and approved before being allocated to industries by the member states. The presence of the NAP is a strong indication of the authority that the UK government retains over carbon governance. For it is still the UK government that is the delegator of emissions, and it is they who negotiate the UK allowances with the EC. While there has to be agreement from the EC with regards to the proposed NAP, the fact remains that the UK government is the central administrator for emissions and therefore its place in the carbon governance system in this respect has not been diminished.

The Environment Agency and the EU ETS
A large part of the administrative burden of the EU ETS falls on to The Environment Agency, a “non-departmental public body” who are actually responsible not to DECC, but to DEFRA. Although DECC are the body responsible for implementing the EU ETS into law and for the setting of the overall targets, the Environment Agency issues guidance documents, collates data on the trading of emissions and deals with applications for Greenhouse Gas Emissions Permits, which firms need in order to participate in the scheme. They also administer, on behalf of the EC, the penalties for non-compliance. These facts point towards the government and the EU seeking the expertise of a specialised body in order to fulfil their policy aims. Using The Environment Agency to assist in ensuring that the targets are met and performance of the system is maintained is not a loss of power for the government, but them ensuring that their overall targets are met by a delegation of responsibility.

CRC Energy Efficiency Scheme
The CRC Energy Efficiency Scheme is further evidence of the UK government's “recourse to specialised regulatory remits” in order to effectively govern carbon emissions in England. The CRC scheme is a further mandatory cap-and-trade scheme aimed at large public and private sector organisations who account for 10% of the UK's carbon emissions. It seeks to include organisations not covered by the EU ETS. It is again reflective of the UK government's disposition towards employing market mechanisms in order to govern carbon emissions, and it is they who have imposed this legislation on businesses, representing an exercise of central power. However, a large bulk of the implementation of the scheme is carried out by The Environment Agency.

The Environment Agency and the CRC
The Environment Agency has a key role to play in the imposition of the scheme. It is responsible for collecting data regarding participating companies’ emissions which it then ranks in a league table “based on participant's changes in energy use against a baseline and not their total emissions” with the hope that carbon efficiency will become a “reputational issue" for those involved. The Environment Agency also hosts the CRC Registry where participants can register details and trade their emissions. It is also responsible for administering any sanctions for non-compliance. This is a classic example of the government using the skills of, in this case, a non-governmental public body in order to administer a policy they have established. Again, it is not an example of the power to govern being taken away from central government as the “enactment of legislation is evident as an explicit assertion of hierarchy”. It is the government who has delegated this responsibility to The Environment Agency, and they remain the ultimate statutory authority for the scheme.

Non-governmental organisations in the process 
While there are several instruments employed by central government to set targets and influence carbon behaviour in businesses and in individuals, how these actors achieve the reductions being set is not specified explicitly by DECC. In this case, businesses often rely on non-governmental organisations (NGOs) to help them deliver the targets being set by government regulation. These NGOs are experts in the carbon and energy field and are therefore consulted upon by businesses and the government in order to ensure that policies are delivered effectively. In that way DECC can be said to be at the centre of a “highly centralised network” of carbon governance actors. This does detract from their hierarchical authority of DECC as they are the central figure in the network, it is simply a recognition that they need to “forge coalitions with societal interests in order to achieve their policy goals”.

Climate Energy
A good example of an NGO that has close links with the government and helps deliver their policy goals is Climate Energy. Established in 2005, they are an energy agency “specialising in advice and funding solutions” for businesses and homeowners to help them with carbon efficiency. They offer a range of services including a consultancy service and grants for low carbon technologies. What is important to note here is that Climate Energy is a private company and therefore has no standing within government, but it does have a significant role to play in government legislation, as exemplified below.

Climate Energy and the Carbon Emission Reduction Target (CERT)
CERT is another scheme introduced by the government that requires large energy supply companies to “make savings in the amount of  emitted by householders”.<name="CE"/> It obliges energy companies to “promote and offer funding towards measures that improve energy efficiency in the home”. While a good intentioned scheme, individual householders are arguably not in a position to best judge what measures are best suited to their position, or may not be aware of what grants are available to them. Climate Energy offers a consultancy service promising to “leverage funding from utilities to support projects” for their clients through their connections in the industry. The initial government legislation was aimed at the energy suppliers with the overall aim of delivering individual household carbon reduction, but the actual delivery of this service has been performed by a private energy agency. The government is still the "central player" in that they have implemented the policy, but Climate Energy's services ensure that it is delivered and represents further evidence of central government steering the actions of actors at lower levels.

Climate energy and The Green Deal
The Green Deal looks set to become a major part of carbon governance in the future, in that it is aimed at individual households in an attempt to improve carbon efficiency and make the transition for households to low-carbon energy as cost-effective as possible. Climate Energy have actually been consulted by DECC as part of the consultation process before The Green Deal is implemented fully. This is representative of a discretionary style of governance, in that the government department is keen to consult specialised agencies before implementing their scheme. The citing of Climate Energy as a consultee is used to legitimise the decision as it shows that a climate and energy efficiency expert has influenced the policy. The Green Deal will still be a centrally commissioned and regulated scheme, but the consultation process allows for specialist views to be taken into account when the policy is formulated.

References

Climate change in the United Kingdom
Governance of England